Hastings Lake is a hamlet in Alberta, Canada within Strathcona County.

Demographics 
The population of Hastings Lake according to the 2022 municipal census conducted by Strathcona County is 102, a decrease from its 2018 municipal census population count of 104.

See also 
List of communities in Alberta
List of hamlets in Alberta

References 

Designated places in Alberta
Hamlets in Alberta
Strathcona County